John Lungeny Tshibumbu (born 6 January 1989) is a Congolese former professional footballer who played as a striker. He made one appearance for the DR Congo national team.

Career
Tshibumbu began his career in Cameroon for Pari Mutuel Urbain Camerounais Buea and signed in January 2008 for AS Cannes. On 16 June 2010, Royal Charleroi signed the forward from Cannes.

On 16 May 2015, he scored twice in a 3–2 win for Gazélec Ajaccio against Niort, earning the Corsican club's first promotion to Ligue 1.

Personal life
The Kinshasa-born Tshibumbu is of Congolese and Gabonese descent.

References

External links
 
 

1989 births
Living people
Democratic Republic of the Congo people of Gabonese descent
Sportspeople of Gabonese descent
Democratic Republic of the Congo footballers
Association football forwards
Democratic Republic of the Congo international footballers
Ligue 1 players
Ligue 2 players
Championnat National players
Championnat National 3 players
Belgian Pro League players
Challenger Pro League players
AS Cannes players
R. Charleroi S.C. players
A.F.C. Tubize players
Gazélec Ajaccio players
Tours FC players
Democratic Republic of the Congo expatriate sportspeople in Cameroon
Gabonese expatriate sportspeople in Cameroon
Expatriate footballers in Cameroon
Democratic Republic of the Congo expatriate sportspeople in France
Gabonese expatriate sportspeople in France
Expatriate footballers in France
Democratic Republic of the Congo expatriate sportspeople in Belgium
Gabonese expatriate sportspeople in Belgium
Expatriate footballers in Belgium
21st-century Democratic Republic of the Congo people